Micropentila bakotae is a butterfly in the family Lycaenidae. It is found in the Republic of the Congo. The habitat consists of primary forests.

References

Endemic fauna of the Republic of the Congo
Butterflies described in 1965
Poritiinae